Anthony Evans may refer to:

 Walton Evans (Anthony Walton White Evans, 1817–1886), American civil engineer
 Sir Anthony Evans (judge) (born 1934), judge of the Court of Appeal of England and Wales
 Anthony Evans (cricketer) (1942–2016), South African cricketer
 Anthony G. Evans (1942–2009), British mechanical engineer
 Anthony Evans (skier) (born 1969), Australian cross country skier
 Anthony Evans (basketball) (born 1970), American basketball coach
 Anthony Evans (singer) (born 1978), American Christian singer-songwriter

See also 
 Antony Evans (footballer) (born 1998), English footballer
 Tony Evans (disambiguation)